The 2006 Open de Moselle was a men's tennis tournament played on indoor hard courts. It was the fourth edition of the Open de Moselle, and was part of the International Series of the 2006 ATP Tour. It took place at the Arènes de Metz in Metz, France, from 2 October through 8 October 2006. Third-seeded Novak Djokovic won the singles title.

Finals

Singles

 Novak Djokovic defeated  Jürgen Melzer 4–6, 6–3, 6–2
It was Djokovic's 2nd title of the year, and his 2nd overall.

Doubles

 Richard Gasquet /  Fabrice Santoro defeated  Julian Knowle /  Jürgen Melzer 3–6, 6–1, [11–9]
It was Gasquet's 1st title of the year, and the 1st of his career. It was Santoro's 3rd title of the year, and the 21st of his career.

References

External links
 Official website
 ATP tournament profile
 ITF tournament edition details

2006 ATP Tour
2006 in French tennis